Rosicléia Campos (born 7 November 1969) is a Brazilian judoka. She competed at the 1992 Summer Olympics and the 1996 Summer Olympics.

References

1969 births
Living people
Brazilian female judoka
Olympic judoka of Brazil
Judoka at the 1992 Summer Olympics
Judoka at the 1996 Summer Olympics
Sportspeople from Rio de Janeiro (city)